William Dale Weidlein (January 11, 1892 – December 26, 1983) was an American football coach.  He served as the head football coach at Midland College (now known as Midland University) in Fremont, Nebraska, from 1915 to 1916 and Fort Hays State University in Hays, Kansas, from 1923 to 1928, compiling a career college football coaching record of 26–32–6.

Personal life
William was born in Peabody, Kansas, on January 11, 1892, of parents John Valentine Weidlein and Emma Belle (Van Dyke) Weidlein.  His uncle, Philip P. Weidlein, was the second mayor of Peabody, Kansas, in 1879. 

William attended the University of Kansas and graduated in 1914. He was a member of the 108th engineers in France during World War I.  He married Ruth Rebecca Benning on December 16, 1917.  William died in Cedar Rapids, Iowa, on December 26, 1983, and was buried in the Leavenworth National Cemetery.

Head coaching record

References

External links
 

1892 births
1983 deaths
American football guards
American football tackles
Fort Hays State Tigers football coaches
Midland Warriors football coaches
Kansas Jayhawks football coaches
Kansas Jayhawks football players
United States Army personnel of World War I
People from Peabody, Kansas
Coaches of American football from Kansas
Players of American football from Kansas